"I Try" is a song co-written and performed by American musician Macy Gray. The song was released on September 27, 1999, as the second single from her debut album, On How Life Is (1999). It is Gray's most successful single to date, peaking at number six in the United Kingdom, number five in the United States, number two in Canada, and number one in Australia, Ireland, and New Zealand.

At the 2001 Grammy Awards, "I Try" won Best Female Pop Vocal Performance, and was nominated for Record of the Year and Song of the Year. It remains Gray's biggest hit single in the US to date, and her only one to reach the top 40 of the Billboard Hot 100. The song was used in the TV sitcom Spin City, when Michael J. Fox's character, Michael Flaherty, was leaving his job and moving from NYC; the actor was also leaving the series after he had announced that he had Parkinson's disease. In 2010, the song was featured in an episode of The Office. It was also featured in the series 2 finale of Mrs. Brown's Boys during which it was sung by Brendan O'Carroll and Pat "Pepsi" Shields. In 2018, the song was featured in an episode of The Last Man on Earth.

Critical reception
Daily Record called the song "soulful", noting that Macy Gray "has one of the most distinctive singing voices around."

Music video
The music video for the song, directed by American filmmaker Mark Romanek (who had previously directed the video for Gray's "Do Something"), depicts Gray waking up in a hotel room, buying flowers, and traveling through New York City, traveled through by bus and train to meet a man in a park. At the end of the video, Gray is shown to still be in her hotel room. It is implied that she may have been dreaming the entire time and that none of the events in the video actually occurred.

At the 2000 MTV Video Music Awards, the video won Best New Artist and was nominated for Best Female Video and Best New Artist in a Video. Gray presented the award for Best Pop Video alongside LL Cool J.

Track listings

 UK CD1
 "I Try" – 3:59
 "I Try" (Full Crew Mix) – 5:21
 "Don't Come Around" – 4:20

 UK CD2
 "I Try" – 3:59
 "I Try" (JayDee Remix) – 5:55
 "I Try" (Bob Power Remix) – 3:51

 UK cassette single
 "I Try" – 3:59
 "Don't Come Around" – 4:20

 European CD1
 "I Try" – 3:59
 "Rather Hazy" – 3:10

 European CD2
 "I Try" – 3:59
 "Rather Hazy" – 3:10
 "I Try" (Full Crew Mix—extended II—no vocoder) – 5:27

 Australian CD single
 "I Try" – 3:59
 "Rather Hazy" – 3:10
 "Do Something" (Black Apple Mix edit) – 3:33
 "I Try" (Full Crew Mix—extended II—no vocoder) – 5:27

Credits and personnel
Credits are lifted from the On How Life Is album booklet.

Studios
 Recorded and mixed at Paramount Studios, Sunset Sound, and A&M Studios (Hollywood, California)

Personnel

 Macy Gray – lyrics, music, back-up vocals
 Jeremy Ruzumna – music, organ
 Jinsoo Lim – music
 David Wilder – music, bass
 Jon Brion – guitars, piano, orchestra bells
 Bendrix Williams – guitars
 Patrick Warren – Chamberlin
 Matt Chamberlain – drums
 Lenny Castro – percussion
 Andrew Slater – production
 Dave Way – recording, mixing

Charts

Weekly charts

Year-end charts

Certifications

Release history

References

1990s ballads
1999 singles
Macy Gray songs
Music videos directed by Mark Romanek
Number-one singles in Australia
Irish Singles Chart number-one singles
Number-one singles in New Zealand
Contemporary R&B ballads
Songs written by Jeremy Ruzumna
Songs written by Macy Gray
1999 songs
Epic Records singles
Grammy Award for Best Female Pop Vocal Performance